Tumtum is a Kadu language spoken in Kordofan. Dialects are Karondi (Kurondi, Korindi), Talassa, and Tumtum proper.

References

External links
 Tumtum basic lexicon at the Global Lexicostatistical Database

Languages of Sudan
Kadu languages
Severely endangered languages